Steinhovden is a village with 119 inhabitants in the municipality of Kinn in Vestland county, Norway. The village area is divided into 6 farm areas: Seljeset, Høyvik, Holmesund, Steinhovden, Steinvik and Hopen. The chairman of the area is now trying to get a windmill park built to produce electrical energy for the community. The nearby Skårafjæra area is a popular place for tourists. The hunting season begins 11 September and hunters may go after deer, seal, and whales.

Sports
There are many sporting opportunities in Steinhovden including association football, speed skating, cross-country skiing, swimming, Scuba diving, polo, figure skating, and race walking.

Culture
Steintøff 4H
Koret
Magne Steinhovden (painter)

Notable residents
 Jarle Steinhovden  Political rabulist. He is called The Sledge Hammer. Using a sledgehammer he has turned to silence parking automats in Scandinavia.
 Atle Steinhovden Marine biologist. Salmon Farm Protest Group Chairman in Western Fjords.
 Gunnvar and his windmill Read about his project.
 Alf Steinhovden, radical politician

References

Villages in Vestland
Kinn